The 1923 Quebec general election was held on February 5, 1923, to elect members of the 16th Legislative Assembly of Quebec, Canada. The incumbent Quebec Liberal Party, led by Louis-Alexandre Taschereau, was re-elected, defeating the Quebec Conservative Party, led by Arthur Sauvé.

It was the first of four election victories in a row for Taschereau.  However, he had held office since 1920, following the resignation of the previous premier, Lomer Gouin.

Redistribution of ridings
An Act passed prior to the election increased the number of MLAs from 81 to 85 through the following changes:

Results
This was the last Quebec election in which a candidate won in multiple ridings. Joseph-Édouard Perrault took both Abitibi and Arthabaska, and he would later resign from Abitibi to allow Hector Authier to be elected in a byelection later that year.

|-
! colspan=2 rowspan=2 | Political party
! rowspan=2 | Party leader
! colspan=4 | MPPs
! colspan=4 | Votes
|-
! Candidates
!1919
!1923
!±
!#
! ±
!%
! ± (pp)
|-
|rowspan="3" |  
|style="text-align:left;" colspan="10"|Government candidates
|-
|style="text-align:left;" |
|style="text-align:left;"|Louis-Alexandre Taschereau
|83
|74
|64
|10
|149,730
|82,438
|51.52
|0.39
|-
|style="text-align:left;" |
|style="text-align:left;"|–
|3
|2
|–
|2
|5,554
|6,952
|1.91
|7.74
|-
|rowspan="6" |  
|style="text-align:left;" colspan="10"|Opposition candidates
|-
|style="text-align:left;" |
|style="text-align:left;"|Arthur Sauvé
|66
|5
|20
|15
|114,285
|92,295
|39.32
|22.36
|-
|style="text-align:left;" |
|style="text-align:left;"|–
|3
|–
|1
|1
|3,684
|
|1.27
|
|-
|style="text-align:left;" |
|style="text-align:left;"|–
|6
|–
|–
|–
|4,931
|
|1.70
|
|-
|style="text-align:left;" |
|style="text-align:left;"|–
|3
|–
|–
|–
|3,180
|
|1.09
|
|-
|style="text-align:left;" |
|style="text-align:left;"|–
|3
|–
|–
|–
|2,439
|
|0.84
|
|-
|rowspan="4" |  
|style="text-align:left;" colspan="10"|Other candidates
|-
|style="text-align:left;" |
|style="text-align:left;"|–
|10
|–
|–
|–
|5,586
|16,316
|1.92
|14.96
|-
|style="text-align:left;" |
|style="text-align:left;"|–
|1
|–
|–
|–
|925
|
|0.32
|
|-
|style="text-align:left;" |
|style="text-align:left;"|–
|1
|–
|–
|–
|335
|
|0.11
|
|-
! colspan="3" style="text-align:left;" | Total
| 179
| 81
! " colspan="2"| 85
! " colspan="2"| 290,649
! " colspan="2"| 100%
|-
| colspan="7" style="text-align:left;" | Rejected ballots
| 3,808
| 2,360
| colspan="2"|
|-
| colspan="7" style="text-align:left;" | Voter turnout
| 294,457
| 163,273
| 62.02
| 6.91
|-
| colspan="7" style="text-align:left;" | Registered electors (contested ridings only)
| 474,794
| 236,742
| colspan="2"|
|-
| colspan="5" style="text-align:left;" | Candidates returned by acclamation
| 8
| 37
| colspan="4"|
|}

Eight Liberal MLAs were returned by acclamation:

See also
 List of Quebec premiers
 Politics of Quebec
 Timeline of Quebec history
 List of Quebec political parties
 16th Legislative Assembly of Quebec

Further reading

References

Quebec general election
Elections in Quebec
General election
Quebec general election